Echinostomata is a suborder of the parasitic flatworm order Plagiorchiida. The suborder contains numerous species that are parasitic in humans.

Families
All families are in the superfamily Echinostomatoidea Looss, 1902. It has been synonymised with Cyclocoeloidea Stossich, 1902.
Calycodidae Dollfus, 1929
Cyclocoelidae Stossich, 1902
Echinochasmidae Odhner, 1910
Echinostomatidae Looss, 1899
Eucotylidae Cohn, 1904
Fasciolidae Railliet, 1895
Himasthlidae Odhner, 1910
Philophthalmidae Looss, 1899
Psilostomidae Looss, 1900
Rhytidodidae Odhner, 1926
Typhlocoelidae Harrah, 1922

References

 
Protostome suborders